
Gmina Oświęcim is a rural gmina (administrative district) in Oświęcim County, Lesser Poland Voivodeship, in southern Poland. Its seat is the town of Oświęcim, although the town is not part of the territory of the gmina.

Villages
Gmina Oświęcim contains the villages and settlements of Babice, Broszkowice, Brzezinka, Dwory II, Grojec, Harmęże, Łazy, Osada Stawy Grojeckie, Pławy, Poręba Wielka, Rajsko, Stawy Monowskie, Włosienica and Zaborze.

Neighbouring gminas
Gmina Oświęcim is bordered by the towns of Bieruń and Oświęcim, and by the gminas of Bojszowy, Brzeszcze, Chełmek, Kęty, Libiąż, Miedźna, Osiek, Polanka Wielka and Przeciszów.

References
Polish official population figures 2006

Oswiecim
Oświęcim County